Rockville is a city that serves as the county seat of Montgomery County, Maryland, United States, and is part of the Baltimore–Washington metropolitan area. The 2020 census tabulated Rockville's population at 67,117, making it the fifth-largest community in Montgomery County.

Rockville, along with neighboring Gaithersburg and Bethesda, is at the core of the Interstate 270 Technology Corridor which is home to numerous software and biotechnology companies as well as several federal government institutions. The city, one of the major retail hubs in Montgomery County, also has several upscale regional shopping centers.

History

Early history
Situated in the Piedmont region and crossed by three creeks (Rock Creek, Cabin John Creek, and Watts Branch), Rockville provided an excellent refuge for semi-nomadic Native Americans as early as 8000 BC. By the first millennium BC, a few of these groups had settled down into year-round agricultural communities that exploited the native flora, including sunflowers and marsh elder. By AD 1200, these early groups (dubbed Montgomery Indians by later archaeologists) were increasingly drawn into conflict with the Senecas and Susquehannocks who had migrated south from Pennsylvania and New York. Within the present-day boundaries of the city, six prehistoric sites have been uncovered and documented, along with numerous artifacts several thousand years old. By the year 1700, under pressure from European colonists, the majority of these original inhabitants had been driven away.

The indigenous population carved a path on the high ground, known as Sinequa Trail, which is now downtown Rockville. Later, the Maryland Assembly set the standard of 20 feet for main thoroughfares and designated the Rock Creek Main Road or Great Road to be built to this standard. In the mid-18th century, Lawrence Owen opened a small inn on the road. The place, known as Owen's Ordinary, took on greater prominence when, on April 14, 1755, Major General Edward Braddock stopped at Owen's Ordinary on a start of a mission from George Town (now Washington, D.C.) to press British claims of the western frontier. The location of the road, near the present Rockville Pike, was strategically located on higher ground making it dry year-round.

18th century
The first land patents in the Rockville area were obtained by Arthur Nelson between 1717 and 1735. Within three decades, the first permanent buildings in what would become the center of Rockville were established on this land. Still a part of Prince George's County at this time, the growth of Daniel Dulaney's Frederick Town prompted the separation of the western portion of the county, including Rockville, into Frederick County in 1748.

Being a small, unincorporated town, early Rockville was known by a variety of names, including Owen's Ordinary, Hungerford's Tavern, and Daley's Tavern. The first recorded mention of the settlement which would later become known as Rockville dates to the Braddock Expedition in 1755. On April 14, one of the approximately two thousand men who were accompanying General Braddock through wrote the following: "we marched to larance Owings or Owings Oardianary, a Single House, it being 18 miles and very dirty." Owen's Ordinary was a small rest stop on Rock Creek Main Road (later the Rockville Pike), which stretched from George Town to Frederick Town, and was then one of the largest thoroughfares in the colony of Maryland.

On September 6, 1776, the Maryland Constitutional Convention agreed to a proposal introduced by Thomas Sprigg Wootton wherein Frederick County, the largest and most populous county in Maryland, would be divided into three smaller units. The southern portion of the county, of which Rockville was a part, was named Montgomery County. The most populous and prosperous urban center in this new county was George Town, but its location at the far southern edge rendered it worthless as a seat of local government. Rockville, a small, but centrally located and well-traveled town, was chosen as the seat of the county's government. At the time, Rockville did not have a name; it was generally called Hungerford's Tavern, after the well-known tavern in it. After being named the county seat, the village was referred to by all as Montgomery Court House. The tavern served as the county courthouse, and it held its first such proceedings on May 20, 1777.

In 1784, William Prather Williams, a local landowner, hired a surveyor to lay out much of the town. In his honor, many took to calling the town Williamsburg. In practice, however, Williamsburg and Montgomery Court House were used interchangeably. Rockville came to greater prominence when Montgomery county was created and later when George Town was ceded to the federal government to create the District of Columbia.

19th century

It was first considered to officially name the town Wattsville, after the nearby Watts Branch, but the stream was later considered too small to give its name to the town. On July 16, 1803, when the area was officially entered into the county land records with the name "Rockville," derived from Rock Creek. Nevertheless, the name Montgomery Court House continued to appear on maps and other documents through the 1820s.

By petition of Rockville's citizens, the Maryland General Assembly incorporated the village on March 10, 1860. During the American Civil War, General George B. McClellan stayed at the Beall Dawson house in 1862. In addition, General J.E.B. Stuart and an army of 8,000 Confederate cavalrymen marched through and occupied Rockville on June 28, 1863, while on their way to Gettysburg and stayed at the Prettyman house. Jubal Anderson Early had also crossed through Maryland on his way to and from his attack on Washington. In 1913, on the birthday of Jefferson Davis, the United Daughters of the Confederacy erected a statue near the Rockville courthouse dedicated to Confederate soldiers from Montgomery County. The monument was removed in 2017 as part of a wave of removals of Confederate monuments and memorials in response to the 2015 Charleston church shooting, and is now located in White's Ferry.

In 1873, the Baltimore and Ohio Railroad arrived, making Rockville easily accessible from Washington, D.C. (See Metropolitan Branch.) In July 1891, the Tennallytown and Rockville Railway inaugurated Rockville's first trolley service connecting to the Georgetown and Tennallytown Railway terminus at Western Avenue and Wisconsin Avenue.

Twentieth century to today

The newly opened railroad provided service from Georgetown to Rockville, connecting Rockville to Washington, D.C., by trolley. Trolley service operated for four decades, until, eclipsed by the growing popularity of the automobile, service was halted in August 1935. The Blue Ridge Transportation Company provided bus service for Rockville and Montgomery County from 1924 through 1955. After 1955, Rockville would not see a concerted effort to develop a public transportation infrastructure until the 1970s, when the Washington Metropolitan Area Transit Authority (WMATA) began work to extend the Washington Metro into Rockville and extended Metrobus service into Montgomery County. The Rockville station of Washington Metro began service on July 25, 1984, and the Twinbrook station began service on December 15, 1984. Metrobus service was supplemented by Montgomery County's own Ride On bus service starting in 1979. MARC, Maryland's Rail Commuter service, serves Rockville with its Brunswick line. From Rockville MARC provides service to Union Station in Washington D.C. (southbound) and, Frederick and Martinsburg, West Virginia (northbound), as well as intermediate points. Amtrak, the national passenger rail system, provides service from Rockville to Chicago and Washington D.C.

The mid-20th century saw substantial growth in Rockville, especially with the annexation of the Twinbrook subdivision in 1949, which added hundreds of new homes and thousands of new residents to the city. In 1954, Congressional Airport closed, and its land was sold to developers to build residences and a commercial shopping center. The shopping center, named Congressional Plaza, opened in 1958. These new areas provided affordable housing and grew quickly with young families eager to start their lives following World War II.

During the Cold War, it was considered safer to remain in Rockville than to evacuate during a hypothetical nuclear attack on Washington, D.C. Bomb shelters were built, including the largest one at Glenview Mansion and 15 other locations. The I-270 highway was designated as an emergency aircraft landing strip. Two Nike missile launcher sites were located on Muddy Branch and Snouffer School Roads until the mid-1970s.

From the 1960s, Rockville's town center, formerly one of the area's commercial centers, suffered from a period of decline. Rockville soon became the first city in Maryland to enter into a government funded urban renewal program. This resulted in the demolition of most of the original business district. Included in the plan was the unsuccessful Rockville Mall, which failed to attract either major retailers or customers and was demolished in 1994, various government buildings such as the new Montgomery County Judicial Center, and a reorganization of the road plan near the Courthouse. Unfortunately, the once-promising plan was for the most part a disappointment. Although efforts to restore the town center continue, the majority of the city's economic activity has since relocated along Rockville Pike (MD Route 355/Wisconsin Avenue). In 2004, Rockville Mayor Larry Giammo announced plans to renovate the Rockville Town Square, including building new stores and housing and relocating the city's library. In the past year, the new Rockville Town Center has been transformed and includes a number of boutique-like stores, restaurants, condominiums and apartments, as well as stages, fountains and the Rockville Library. The U.S. Nuclear Regulatory Commission's headquarters is just south of the city's corporate limits.

The city is closely associated with the neighboring towns of Kensington and the unincorporated census-designated place, North Bethesda. The Music Center at Strathmore, an arts and theater center, opened in February 2005 in the latter of these two areas and is presently the second home of the Baltimore Symphony Orchestra, and the Fitzgerald Theatre in Rockville Civic Center Park has provided diverse entertainment since 1960. In 1998, Regal Cinemas opened in Town Center and the city annexed 900 acres of land.

The city also has a brass band in the British style.

The R.E.M. song "(Don't Go Back To) Rockville", released in 1984, was written by Mike Mills about not wanting his girlfriend Ingrid Schorr to return to Rockville, Maryland.

In 1975, F. Scott Fitzgerald and Zelda Fitzgerald's caskets were reinterred at St. Mary's Catholic Church in Rockville, Maryland where his father, Edward, and a number of Key family members had been buried.

Historic places

Historic structures on the Register in and around downtown Rockville are:
 Beall–Dawson House (1815)
 Bingham-Brewer House (1821)
 Dawson Farm (1874)
 Glenview Mansion (1926)
 Montgomery County Courthouse Historic District (1939)
 New Mark Commons (1967)
 Old St. Mary's Church (1817)
 Rockville Park Historic District (1884)
 Rockville Railroad Station (1873)
 West Montgomery Avenue Historic District (1880)

Rockville vicinity
 Montrose Schoolhouse (1909)

Geography

Climate
The climate in this area is characterized by hot, humid summers and generally mild to cool winters. According to the Köppen Climate Classification system Rockville has a humid subtropical climate, abbreviated "Cfa" on climate maps. The average first frost occurs on October 21, and the average final frost occurs on April 16.

Demographics

Income
The median income for a household in the city as of 2020 was $111,797. As of 2007, the median income for a family was $98,257. Males had a median income of $53,764 versus $38,788 for females. In 2015, the per capita income for the city was $49,399. 7.8% of the population and 5.6% of families were below the poverty line. Out of the total population, 8.9% of those under the age of 18 and 7.9% of those 65 and older were living below the poverty line.

2010 census
As of the census of 2010, there were 61,209 people, 23,686 households, and 15,524 families residing in the city. The racial makeup of the city was 60.4% White (52.8% non-Hispanic white), 9.6% African American, 0.3% Native American, 20.6% Asian, 5.3% from other races, and 3.8% from two or more races. Hispanic or Latino of any race were 14.3% of the population.

There were 23,686 households, of which 31.8% had children under the age of 18 living with them, 52.3% were married couples living together, 9.9% had a female householder with no husband present, 3.4% had a male householder with no wife present, and 34.5% were non-families. 27.0% of all households were made up of individuals, and 9.5% had someone living alone who was 65 years of age or older. The average household size was 2.54 and the average family size was 3.08.

The median age in the city was 38.7 years.  And 21.5% of residents were under the age of 18; 7.2% were between the ages of 18 and 24; 31.1% were from 25 to 44; 26.3% were from 45 to 64; and 14% were 65 years of age or older. The gender makeup of the city was 47.9% male and 52.1% female.

Economy
Choice Hotels, Westat, and Bethesda Softworks/ZeniMax Media are headquartered in Rockville.

Largest employers
According to the city's 2018 Comprehensive Annual Financial Report, the top employers in the city are:

Sports
 Rockville Express, a Cal Ripken, Sr. Collegiate Baseball League team, 2007 CRSCBL League Champions
 The city is also home to the Rockville Baseball Association, a youth baseball and softball organization that has offered programing every year since its founding in 1954.

Government

Rockville has a council-manager form of government.

In November 2019, Rockville voted in the 66th election for Mayor and Council.

Rockville voters re-elected Bridget Donnell Newton as mayor.

Four councilmembers were also elected: Monique Ashton, Beryl L. Feinberg, David Myles and Mark Pierzchala.

Mayor
The current mayor of Rockville is Bridget Donnell Newton.

Rockville was incorporated in 1860, but its early records were destroyed by Confederate soldiers in July 1864.

Rockville's mayors include:

Representative body

Rockville has a four-member City Council, whose members, along with the mayor, serve as the governing body of the city. The four councilmembers are Monique Ashton, Beryl L. Feinberg, David Myles and Mark Pierzchala.

Rockville has 26 boards and commissions: Animal Matters Board, Board of Appeals, Board of Supervisors of Elections, Charter Review Commission, Community Policing Advisory Board, Compensation Commission, Cultural Arts Commission, Environment Commission, Ethics Commission, Financial Advisory Board, Historic District Commission, Human Rights Commission, Human Services Advisory Commission, Landlord-Tenant Affairs Commission, Personnel Appeals Board, Planning Commission, Recreation and Park Advisory Board, Retirement Board, Rockville Economic Development Inc. (REDI), Rockville Housing Enterprises, Rockville Recreation and Parks Foundation, Rockville Seniors Inc. (RSI), Rockville Sister City Corporation, Senior Citizens Commission, Sign Review Board, and Traffic and Transportation Commission. Boards and commissions allows members of the community to partner with city staff to shape Rockville's future by sharing expertise and advising the Mayor and Council.

Education
Rockville is served by the Montgomery County Public Schools system. Public high schools in Rockville include Thomas S. Wootton High School, Richard Montgomery High School, and Rockville High School. Prior to integration in 1961, black students were educated at George Washington Carver High School in Rockville. The John L. Gildner Regional Institute for Children and Adolescents provides education for children with special educational needs.

St. Elizabeth Catholic School of the Roman Catholic Archdiocese of Washington is in Rockville.

Private schools located near Rockville (with Rockville postal addresses) include:
 Charles E. Smith Jewish Day School (North Bethesda)
 Melvin J. Berman Hebrew Academy (Aspen Hill)
Montrose Christian School in North Bethesda has closed.

Higher Education
The Montgomery College (MC), main campus is located within Rockville and enrolls more than 15,000 students as of March 2019. The college is accredited by the Middle States Association of Colleges and Schools.

Additional Institutions of higher education in Rockville include the University of Maryland Global Campus (main campus is in Adelphi, Maryland), The Johns Hopkins University Montgomery County Campus (main campus is in Baltimore, Maryland), and the Universities at Shady Grove, a collaboration of nine Maryland public degree-granting institutions, all have Rockville addresses, but are just outside the city limits.

Public Library
The Rockville Memorial Library is available to the residents of Rockville. The Rockville Memorial Library offers services for residents and visitors to access books, databases, newspapers, magazines, and internet access.

Transportation

Roads and highways
The most prominent highway directly serving Rockville is Interstate 270. I-270 is the main highway leading northwest out of metropolitan Washington, D.C., beginning at Interstate 495 (the Capital Beltway) and proceeding northwestward to Interstate 70 in Frederick. Maryland Route 355 was the precursor to I-270 and follows a parallel route, and now serves as the main commercial roadway through Rockville and neighboring communities. Other state highways serving Rockville directly include Maryland Route 28, Maryland Route 189, Maryland Route 586, Maryland Route 660 and Maryland Route 911. Interstate 370 and Maryland Route 200 do not directly enter the city, but pass just outside the city limits.

Public transportation
The Washington Metro Red Line rail system can be accessed at Rockville station and Twinbrook station. The Brunswick Line of the MARC commuter rail system runs to and from Washington, D.C., and can be accessed at Rockville Station. Amtrak trains also serve Rockville.

Bus service connects Rockville directly to the regional transit hub at Baltimore–Washington International Airport, and to downtown Baltimore via the Maryland Transit Administration ICC Bus and the Baltimore Light Rail. Ride On buses provides service within the city and to places within the county like Gaithersburg, Clarksburg and Silver Spring.

Law enforcement
The city is served by the Rockville City Police Department and is aided by the Montgomery County Police Department as directed by the relevant authorities.

Notable people
 Tori Amos, singer-songwriter and pianist
 Jamshid Amouzegar, former Prime Minister of Iran
 Dragoslav Avramović, former Governor of the National Bank of Yugoslavia
 BT, musician
 Gordy Coleman, Major League Baseball player 
 Jerome Dyson (born 1987), professional basketball player
Pablo Eisenberg (1932–2022), scholar, social justice advocate, and tennis player
 Paul Goldstein (born 1976), tennis player
 Virginia Hall, American spy and OSS operative, died in Rockville
 Elden Henson, actor known for The Mighty Ducks franchise and as Pollux in the Hunger Games movie series
 Spike Jonze, film director
 Logic, rapper and record producer
 Helen Maroulis, Olympic wrestler
 Rachel Parsons, figure skater, 2017 junior national champion
 Haley Skarupa, professional ice hockey player
 Josh Tillman ("Father John Misty"), musician
 Frederick Yeh, biologist and animal welfare activist

Sister cities
Rockville has two sister cities:
  Pinneberg, Schleswig-Holstein, Germany
  Yilan City, Yilan County, Taiwan

Although not a sister city, Rockville also has friendly relations with another city:
  Jiaxing, Zhejiang Province, China

See also
 List of famous people from the Washington, D.C., metropolitan area
 Tower Oaks – a planned community in Rockville

References

External links

 
 Official website
 The Washington Posts Guide to Rockville
 
 

 
Populated places established in 1717
Populated places established in 1803
Populated places established in 1860
Cities in Montgomery County, Maryland
County seats in Maryland
1717 establishments in Maryland
1803 establishments in Maryland
1860 establishments in Maryland
Cities in Maryland